Himatanthus bracteatus is a species of the genus Himatanthus (Apocynaceae), native Venezuela, Colombia, the Guianas, Brazil, Peru, and Ecuador. It is a shrub with oblong, obovate and acuminate leaves, white flowers in terminal corymbs and follicles with winged seed.

Names
In Portuguese, it is called janaúba, angélica-da-mata and banana-de-papagaio.

References

bracteatus
Flora of South America
Plants described in 1844